William Harvey (13 July 1796 – 13 January 1866) was a British wood-engraver and illustrator.

Born at Newcastle upon Tyne, Harvey was the son of a bath-keeper. At the age of 14, he was apprenticed to Thomas Bewick, and became one of his favorite pupils. Bewick describes him as one "who both as an engraver & designer, stands preeminent" at his day (Memoir, p. 200). He engraved many woodblocks for Bewick's Aesop's Fables (1818).

Harvey moved to London in 1817, studying drawing with Benjamin Haydon, and anatomy with Charles Bell. In 1821, he made a wood-engraving after Haydon in imitation of engraving, the large block of the Assassination of L. S. Dentatus. This was probably the then most ambitious woodblock which had been cut in England.

Harvey switched to design, after the death of John Thurston, the then leading wood designer in London. One of his earliest works is his illustrations for Alexander Henderson's History of Ancient and Modern Wines in 1824.

His masterpieces are his illustrations to Northcote's Fables (1823–33) and to E. W. Lane's The Arabian Nights' Entertainments (1838–40).

Harvey is buried in Richmond Cemetery.

Gallery

References
Bewick, Thomas (1975). A Memoir of Thomas Bewick. Edited with an introduction by Iain Bain.  London; New York: Oxford University Press.

Notes

External links
Harvey's illustrations to Arabian Nights at Arabian Nights Books
 Assassination of L. S. Dentatus at Art of the Print
William Harvey at Wood Engraving, an Art Lost and Found: Engravers and Illustrators
 
 

1796 births
1866 deaths
Burials at Richmond Cemetery
British wood engravers
British illustrators